These are the Group D Results and Standings:

Standings

Results/Fixtures

All times given below are in Central European Time.

Game 1
December 11–12, 2007

Game 2
December 18, 2007

Game 3
January 8, 2008

Game 4
January 15, 2008

Game 5
January 22, 2008

Game 6
January 29, 2008

Group D
2007–08 in Ukrainian basketball
2007–08 in Russian basketball
2007–08 in French basketball
2007–08 in Latvian basketball